John Allan was a Scottish footballer who played as an inside forward, initially for Blantyre Celtic and then in the Scottish Football League for Hamilton Academical.

He made his debut for Hamilton on 17 December 1932 in a 4–4 draw against Rangers at Ibrox in a game in which he scored. He was said to have good ability in making long kicks upfield. He scored two goals in 15 league appearances for Accies across two seasons.

He played cricket locally for Uddingston.

References 

Scottish footballers
Scottish Football League players
Scottish Junior Football Association players
Blantyre Celtic F.C. players
Hamilton Academical F.C. players
Association football inside forwards
Year of birth missing
Year of death missing
Place of birth missing